Fulókércs is a  village in Borsod-Abaúj-Zemplén County in northeastern Hungary.  it had a population of 393; in 2009 it was 387.

References

Populated places in Borsod-Abaúj-Zemplén County